The 1954-55 Oberliga season was the seventh season of the Oberliga, the top level of ice hockey in Germany. Eight teams participated in the league, and EV Füssen won the championship.

Regular season

References

Oberliga (ice hockey) seasons
West
Ger